The Black Krim (also known as Black Crimea and Noire de Crimée) is an heirloom tomato originating from Crimea. The plant is open-pollinated, indeterminate, bearing 8 ounce flattened globe fruits that are dark reddish-purple to black with green/brown shoulders.

In 1990 it became the first "black" tomato to be commercially available in the United States.

References

See also
 List of tomato cultivars
 Heirloom tomato

Tomato cultivars